"La Muerte No Es El Final" (Death Is Not The End) is a Christian song composed by the Spanish priest Cesáreo Gabaráin Azurmendi (1936–1991), after the death of Juan Pedro, a young organist in his church. Gabaráin composed hundreds of religious songs, some of them known worldwide such as "Pescador de Hombres". 

The Spanish Armed Forces later adopted the song as a hymn to pay tribute to those who died in military service.

References 

Spanish songs
Military music
Christian hymns
Funerary and memorial compositions
Military of Spain
1981 songs